Kidder is a census-designated place in Marshall County, South Dakota, United States. Its population was 25 at the 2020 census.

Kidder was laid out in 1885 and most likely was named after Jefferson P. Kidder, a Dakota Territory legislator. It is approximately eight miles north of Britton, the county seat of Marshall County. The streets of the CDP are named after trees (ex. Pine St., Elm St.), while the avenues of the CDP are named after fruits (ex. Plum Ave., Apple Ave.)

References 

Census-designated places in Marshall County, South Dakota
Census-designated places in South Dakota
Populated places established in 1885
Populated places in Marshall County, South Dakota